The Malakand Agency was one of the agencies in the North West Frontier Province of British India and later of Pakistan until 2010. It included the princely states of Chitral, Dir and Swat, and an area around the Malakand Pass known as the Malakand Protected Area. The largest city in the area was Mingora, while the three state capitals were Chitral, Dir, and Saidu Sharif.  In 1970, following the abolition of the princely states, the agency became the Malakand Division, which was divided into districts, one of which was the Malakand Protected Area, known as Malakand District. In 2000 the Malakand Division was abolished.  Despite the constitutional changes since 1970, the expression Malakand Agency is still used, sometimes of the entire area of the former Agency, but more often of Malakand District.

History
The Malakand Agency was one of the tribal areas in the Khyber Pakhtunkhwa of Pakistan until 2010. It included the princely states of Chitral, Dir and Swat, and an area around the Malakand Fort known as the Malakand Protected Area.

Location
The Swat River flows through it down towards Charsadda District where it falls into the Kabul River. Malakand Agency is bounded on the north by Lower Dir District, on the East by Swat District, on the south east and south west by Mardan and Charsadda districts respectively and on the west by Mohmand and Bajour Agencies. The area of Malakand protected area is 952 km2. Malakand Agency is divided into two sub-division, Swat Ranizai and Sam Ranizai. Malakand is the headquarters of Malakand Agency. The Administration has raised a levy force for the control of law and order situation which is the re-incarnation of the Malakand Field Force during the British regime in which Winston Churchill served as a captain. High court extended its jurisdiction to this area in 1974 and district and civil judges work here ever since.

Early history
Historic ruins, founded at different places in the Malakand, indicate that this area was part of Gandhara Mahajanapada. By the 400-300 BCE, the area came under the influence of Hindu-Buddhist Magadha dynasties. The Nanda Empire is believed to have some influence over the area, however, by the time of the Mauryan Empire under Chandragupta Maurya, the area was firmly under the central rule of Magadha dynasty of ancient India. The Mauryans under Ashoka built pillars and edicts throughout the area, marking their rule. Afterward, the area came under several Hindu and Buddhist dynasties. The Buddhist Gandhara civilization flourished in the area, marked by many Buddhist stupas and temples. Concurrently, the Hindus under the Hindu Shahis kings, ruled over the area, creating a Hindu and Buddhist syncretism in the area. During the period from the 8th to 11th century, Hindu Brahmin rule in the area was solidified, along with their Buddhist vassal kings.

The Hindu Shahis rule came to an end with the demise of their last great ruler, Maharaja Jayapala. Later, Muhammad Ghori, invaded this area, and Islam began to spread.

The Yousafzai Pathan tribe came to inhabit this area in the wake of the invasion. After it, Malak Ahmad Khan advanced towards the capital city of Thana, ruled by Swati king Malak Owais. Both the troops fought bravely but in the end, the king began to retreat towards the summer capital of his kingdom Manglawar in upper Swat. But eventually, the king left the entire kingdom and Malak Ahmad became the owner of the throne of the valley of Swat.

Mughals, Sikhs, and British
About 400 years ago, successive Mughal rulers attempted in vain to capture this area. After the fall of the Mughals, Sikh Empire tried to conquer this area. The Sikhs established nominal rule over the area, however, they were not able to established absolute rule over the area. Sikhs under Hari Singh Nalwa did manage to bring Sikh authority under the rulership of Maharaja Ranjit Singh. However, after the fall of the Sikh Empire the area became independent under Pashtun tribal rule, until the arrival of the British.

In 1895, the British approached the elders of Malakand Agency with the request to allow the passage of post to Chitral, which was then in the Administrative sphere of Gilgit. But the then chief of Ranazai tribe Malak Saadat Khan of Khar rejected the request with common consent of the brave Pukhtoon tribes of Khar, Batkhela, Alladand Dheri, Dhari Julagram and Matkanai Thotakan in the favour of  Umara Khan of Jandul and for the sovereignty of Pukhtoon soil and its traditions. For the British forces were advancing towards him. On the other side, the Britisher signed a back door bilateral agreement with the Aslam Khan and Inayat Khan of Thana, Saadat Khan of Alladand and Sarbiland Khan of Palai, the postal runners were allowed through the Agency in exchange for a considerable amount of money to be paid yearly to each.

The Chitral relief expedition, however, necessitated the British intervention in this area. British officer and troops had been besieged in Chitral by Chitralis under Sher Afzal in association with Umara Khan of Jandol. To reinforce their forces there, they needed a route to Chitral as the Gilgit-Chitral road, the only route at that time, was covered with snow and they had no option left except to pass through Malakand Agency. The British therefore laid siege of the Malakand pass. The people fought bravely and offered stubborn resistance to the enemy under the leadership of Malak Saadat Khan of Khar. The British artillery particularly proving more than a match for the old and rusty guns and swords of the natives to fortify their position and ensure the safety of the strategically important Chitral road, they constructed two forts at Malakand and Chakdara with many a picquet overhead the surrounding hills. One of them Churchill piquet, was named after Lt. Churchill who later on became the Prime Minister of the United Kingdom. Since then the British intervened in the politics of the area. A political agent was stationed at Malakand to mediate between the British and the people of the area.

Modern
In 1970, following the abolition of the princely states, the agency became the Malakand Division, which was divided into districts, one of which was the Malakand Protected Area, known as Malakand District. In the year 2000, the Malakand Division was abolished. Despite the constitutional changes since 1970, the expression Malakand Agency is still used, sometimes of the entire area of the former Agency, but more often of Malakand District.

Before 1970, the area was a Tribal Area known as the Malakand Protected Area, part of the Malakand Agency. In 1970 it became Malakand District, a Provincially Administered Tribal Area, until 2000 part of Malakand Division. Malakand agency lies at a strategically important position as it acts as a Gateway to Swat, Dir, Chitral and Bajaur. It is surrounded by a series of mountains that were overgrown with different kinds of trees in the past though they have a barren look today. The famous Malakand Pass which connects Mardan to Swat and Dir is located near Dargai, where the local Pushtun tribes fought two fierce battles with the British army in 1895 and 1897.

After the introduction of Devolution plan in 2001–02, the slot of the political agent has been re-designated as District Co-ordination Officer like the rest of the settled districts.

References

History of Khyber Pakhtunkhwa
Malakand District
Former subdivisions of Pakistan